Heini Wathén-Fayed (née Wathén; born 24 February 1955 in Hanko, Finland) is a former model married to Egyptian businessman Mohamed Al-Fayed. She was an officer for The Ritz Hotel, London.

Modeling career 
Heini Wathén signed with a modelling agency after winning several beauty pageants in Finland at 17 years old. She graduated from secondary school in 1975 and joined her sister in Paris as a model. She returned to Finland two years later to compete in the Miss Finland contest, but did not make it to the finals.

During the Miss Finland contest Wathén met Dodi Fayed, who was looking for new models in Finland. Fayed arranged for Wathén to model for Pierre Balmain's fashion house.

Personal life 
In Paris, Dodi Fayed introduced Wathén to his father Mohamed Al-Fayed, who began a relationship with her. Al-Fayed soon invited Wathén to live with him on Park Lane in London. The couple married in 1985, thus Heini Wathén-Fayed became a stepmother to Dodi Fayed.

Wathén-Fayed has four children with Mohamed Al-Fayed: daughters Jasmine (born 1980) and Camilla (born 1985), and sons Karim (born 1983) and Omar (born 1987).

Wathén-Fayed and Al-Fayed live in Surrey and at a mansion in Espoo, Finland.

References 

Finnish female models
1955 births
Living people
El Fayed family